The 1955 All-Ireland Senior Hurling Championship Final was the 68th All-Ireland Final and the culmination of the 1955 All-Ireland Senior Hurling Championship, an inter-county hurling tournament for the top teams in Ireland. The match was held at Croke Park, Dublin, on 4 September 1955, between Wexford and Galway. The Connacht men lost to their Leinster opponents on a score line of 3-13 to 2-8.

Match details

All-Ireland Senior Hurling Championship Final
All-Ireland Senior Hurling Championship Final, 1955
All-Ireland Senior Hurling Championship Final
All-Ireland Senior Hurling Championship Finals
Galway GAA matches
Wexford GAA matches